Roman Aleksandrovich Lev (born 10 December 1993) is a former Russian professional football player.

Club career
He made his Russian Football National League debut for FC Fakel Voronezh on 8 May 2012 in a game against FC Torpedo Vladimir.

External links
 
 
 Career summary at sportbox.ru

1993 births
Sportspeople from Bryansk
Living people
Russian footballers
FC Fakel Voronezh players
Association football midfielders